The Danger Rider may refer to:

 The Danger Rider (1924 film), silent film directed by Denver Dixon
 The Danger Rider (1928 film), silent film western directed by Henry Macrae